Quercus petraea, commonly known as the sessile oak, Cornish oak, Irish Oak or durmast oak, is a species of oak tree native to most of Europe and into Anatolia and Iran. The sessile oak is the national tree of Ireland, and an unofficial emblem in Wales and Cornwall.

Description 

Quercus) and similar to the pedunculate oak (Q. robur), with which it overlaps extensively in range. The male flowers are grouped into catkins, produced in the spring.

Comparison with pedunculate oak 
Significant botanical differences from pedunculate oak (Q. robur) include the stalked leaves, and the stalkless (sessile) acorns from which one of its common names is derived. Its specific epithet petraea means "of rocky places". Q. robur, on the other hand, prefers deeper, richer soils at lower altitude. Fertile hybrids with Quercus robur named Quercus × rosacea are found wherever the two parent species occur and share or are intermediate in characters between the parents.

Charles Darwin, in Chapter II of On the Origin of Species, noted that the sessile and pedunculate oaks had been described as both distinct species and mere varieties depending on the authority consulted.

Taxonomy
Quercus petraea was first described by Heinrich Gottfried von Mattuschka in 1777 as a variety of Quercus robur, Quercus robur var. petraea. It was raised to a full species by Franz Kaspar Lieblein in 1784.

Subspecies
, Plants of the World Online accepted five subspecies:
Quercus petraea subsp. austrotyrrhenica Brullo, Guarino & Siracusa
Quercus petraea subsp. huguetiana Franco & G.López
Quercus petraea subsp. petraea
Quercus petraea subsp. pinnatiloba (K.Koch) Menitsky
Quercus petraea subsp. polycarpa (Schur) Soó

Diseases and pests 
 Acute oak decline
 Sudden oak death
 The Welsh oak longhorn beetle (Pyrrhidium sanguineum) is named for its host tree; the larvae feed at the bark interface of dead wood.

Uses 
Sessile oak is one of the most important species in Europe both economically and ecologically. Oak timber is traditionally used for building, ships and furniture. Today the best woods are used for quality cabinetmaking, veneers and barrel staves. Rougher material is used for fence construction, roof beams and specialist building work. The wood also has antimicrobial properties. It is also a good fuel wood. During autumns with good acorn crops (the mast years), animals are traditionally grazed under the trees to fatten them.

Pontfadog Oak 
The Pontfadog Oak, once considered to be the oldest oak tree in the UK, was a sessile oak. This grew near Chirk in North Wales. It was understood to be over 1,200 years old, an age that was due to regular pollarding for much of its life. It was lost in April 2013 when it blew down in high winds.

See also 

 Faux de Verzy

References

External links 
 Quercus petraea Royal Horticultural Society
 Quercus petraea – distribution map, genetic conservation units and related resources. European Forest Genetic Resources Programme (EUFORGEN)
 Flora Europaea: Quercus petraea
 Bean, W. J. (1976). Trees and shrubs hardy in the British Isles 8th ed., revised. John Murray.
 Rushforth, K. (1999). Trees of Britain and Europe. HarperCollins .
  Chênes: Quercus petraea
 Den virtuella floran – Distribution
 
 

petraea
Flora of Europe
Plants described in 1777
Trees of mild maritime climate
Trees of humid continental climate
Trees of Mediterranean climate
Trees of Western Asia
Environment of Cornwall
National symbols of the Republic of Ireland